Universidad Alejandro de Humboldt was named in honor of Alexander von Humboldt German naturalist and explorer. UAH is a Venezuelan private university sponsored by the Civil Association Educational Humboldt, created by the National University Council in Resolution No. 28 of 25 July 1997 and authorized in its operation by Presidential Decree No. 2.225 of December 1, 1997.

Student body 
Enrollment is 12,200 including 1200 graduate students, approximately 70 percent women, 30 percent men.

Academic offerings 
UAH offers six bachelor's degree programs and two Engineer's degree programs known as an Engineer Diploma (abbreviated Dipl. Ing. or DI) Engineering education including eight diploma programs and two  master's degree programs (MBA) through its three schools.
  School Social Sciences and Economy
  School Engineering
  School Humanities and Education.

Degrees

School of Engineering 
   Civil Maintenance
   Software Engineering
UAH offers the following undergraduate programs:

School of Humanities and Education 
   Modern Languages
   Publicity - Advertising

School of Social Sciences and Economy 
   Administration
   Accounting
   Economy
   Tourism Administration
   International Commerce

Research 
Research is conducted within the individual colleges. Major interdisciplinary research thrusts include: 
   Information Technology
   Management of science and technology Modeling and simulation
   Systems engineering; and robotics.

Accreditation 
UAH "Universidad Alejandro de Humboldt" is accredited by the Ministry of Higher Education.

Rector 
Soc. Manuel Carlos Sulbarán

Location 
The main university campus is located in Caracas, Miranda State.
   Los Dos Caminos

Av. Rómulo  Gallegos, Con 1ra. Transversal de Montecristo Edificio Universidad Alejandro de Humboldt. Caracas	

There are campuses in Caracas District Capital in:

   Plaza Venezuela (Principal)
Av. Lima, entre Plaza Venezuela y Av. Libertador, 
Edif. Universidad Alejandro de Humboldt. 
Caracas

   Plaza Venezuela (Faces)
Av. Lima, entre Plaza Venezuela y Av. Libertador, 
Edif. Universidad Alejandro de Humboldt. 
Caracas

   El Bosque
Av. Principal del Bosque (Frente a Proseín) 
Edif. Universidad Alejandro de Humboldt. 
Caracas

   Valencia, Carabobo State
Final Av. Pocaterra, Cruce con Calle Colinas, 
El Trigal Centro, 
Edif. Universidad Alejandro de Humboldt.

See also 

 List of universities in Venezuela
 Informatics Engineering
 Business Administration
 Accountancy
 Economy
 International Trade
 Publicity
 Education in Venezuela

External links 
 www.unihumboldt.edu.ve

Universities and colleges in Caracas
Educational institutions established in 1997
1997 establishments in Venezuela
Private universities and colleges in Venezuela